Fons Elders (born 1936) is a Dutch philosopher and an emeritus professor at the University of Humanistic Studies. He was the host of the Chomsky–Foucault debate in 1971. During which, according to Noam Chomsky, he repeatedly nudged Michel Foucault off camera and urged him to don a bright red wig.

References

Philosophy academics
20th-century Dutch philosophers
1936 births
Living people